CBID may refer to:

 Cobalt-precorrin-5B (C1)-methyltransferase
 Cobalamin biosynthesis